Transcription factor Sp1, also known as specificity protein 1* is a protein that in humans is encoded by the SP1 gene.

Function 

The protein encoded by this gene is a zinc finger transcription factor that binds to GC-rich motifs of many promoters. The encoded protein is involved in many cellular processes, including cell differentiation, cell growth, apoptosis, immune responses, response to DNA damage, and chromatin remodeling. Post-translational modifications such as phosphorylation, acetylation, O-GlcNAcylation, and proteolytic processing significantly affect the activity of this protein, which can be an activator or a repressor.

In the SV40 virus, Sp1 binds to the GC boxes in the regulatory region (RR) of the genome.

Structure  

SP1  belongs to the Sp/KLF family of transcription factors. The protein is 785 amino acids long, with a molecular weight of 81 kDa. The SP1 transcription factor contains two glutamine-rich activation domains at its N-terminus that are believed to be necessary for promoter trans-activation. SP1 most notably contains three zinc finger protein motifs at its C-terminus, by which it binds directly to DNA and allows for interaction of the protein with other transcriptional regulators. Its zinc fingers are of the Cys2/His2 type and bind the consensus sequence 5'-(G/T)GGGCGG(G/A)(G/A)(C/T)-3' (GC box element).
Some 12,000 SP-1 binding sites are found in the human genome.

Applications 

Sp1 has been used as a control protein to compare with when studying the increase or decrease of the aryl hydrocarbon receptor and/or the estrogen receptor, since it binds to both and generally remains at a relatively constant level.

Recently, a putative promoter region in FTMT, and positive regulators {SP1, cAMP response element-binding protein (CREB), and Ying Yang 1 (YY1)] and negative regulators [GATA2, forkhead box protein A1 (FoxA1), and CCAAT enhancer-binding protein b (C/EBPb)] of FTMT transcription have been identified (Guaraldo et al, 2016).The effect of DFP on the DNA-binding activity of these regulators to the FTMT promoter was examined using chromatin immunoprecipitation (ChIP) assay. Among the regulators, only SP1 displayed significantly increased DNA- binding activity following DFP treatment in a dose-dependent manner. SP1 knockdown by siRNA abolished the DFP-induced increase in the mRNA levels of FTMT, indicating SP1-mediated regulation of FTMT expression in the presence of DFP. Treatment with Deferiprone increased the expression of cytoplasmic and nuclear SP1 with predominant localization in the nucleus.

Inhibitors 

Plicamycin, an antineoplastic antibiotic produced by Streptomyces plicatus, and Withaferin A, a steroidal lactone from Withania somnifera plant are known to inhibit Sp1 transcription factor.

miR-375-5p microRNA significantly decreased expression of SP1 and YAP1 in colorectal cancer cells. SP1 and YAP1 mRNAs are direct targets of miR-375-5p.

Interactions 

Sp1 transcription factor has been shown to interact with:

 AATF, 
 CEBPB,
 COL1A1,
 E2F1,
 FOSL1, 
 GABPA, 
 HDAC1, 
 HDAC2, 
 HMGA1, 
 HCFC1, 
 HTT, 
 KLF6, 
 MEF2C, 
 MEF2D, 
 MSX1, 
 Myogenin, 
 POU2F1, 
 PPP1R13L, 
 PSMC5, 
 PML, 
 RELA, 
 SMAD3, 
 SUMO1, 
 SF1, 
 TAL1,
 UBC.
 WRN,
 DDX3X

References

Further reading

External links 
 
 

Transcription factors